Jorge Jamil Mahuad Witt (born 29 July 1949) is an Ecuadorian lawyer, academic and former politician. He was the 41st president of Ecuador from 10 August 1998, to 21 January 2000.

Early life
Mahuad was born in Loja, Ecuador.  He is of Lebanese and German descent. 

Mahuad attended Harvard University's John F. Kennedy School of Government, and received a Master of Public Administration in 1989.  He was a US State Department-sponsored Fulbright Fellow.

Presidency
Mahuad initially ran in the presidential election of 1988, coming in a distant fifth place.  He then served as Mayor of Quito from 1992 to 1998.

Ten years after his first presidential run, he won the presidential election by a very close margin.  Álvaro Noboa, the defeated candidate, asked for a vote recount, which was denied by the authority responsible.  There was a severe economic crisis in Ecuador (including the 1998–99 Ecuador banking crisis), which had led to a 60% cut in the armed forces budget.  Mahuad's popularity rating fell from 60% in October 1998 to 6% in January 2000.  In the final days of 1999, he announced the dollarization of the economy of Ecuador, along with a number of International Monetary Fund measures.

Mahuad was forced to resign after a week of demonstrations by indigenous Ecuadorians and a military revolt led by Lucio Gutiérrez.

He proposed economic reforms that produced the "dollarization" of the economy.  He declared a freeze in bank accounts in order to control rampant inflation.  This caused massive unrest as the lower classes struggled to convert their now useless Ecuadorian sucres to US dollars and lost wealth, while the upper classes (whose members already had their wealth invested in US dollars) gained wealth in turn.  Under Mahuad's recession-plagued term, the economy shrank significantly, and inflation reached levels of up to 60 percent.

During Mahuad's presidency, a historic peace agreement with Peru was signed, resolving long-standing border disputes.  Under the agreement, Ecuador renounced its claims to sovereignty of the disputed territory under the Rio de Janeiro Protocol, and in return, Peru deeded ownership of one km² of territory to Ecuador.  Mahuad concluded the peace with Peru on 26 October 1998.

Post-presidency
Mahuad is also a Senior Advisor at CMI International Group in Cambridge, MA.

In May 2014, Ecuador’s National Court of Justice sentenced him to 12 years jail term on embezzlement charges.

References

External links
Extended biography (in Spanish) by CIDOB Foundation
Text of the Rio Protocol
Mahuad and Fujimori

1949 births
Living people
Presidents of Ecuador
Mayors of Quito
Ecuadorian people of Lebanese descent
Ecuadorian people of German descent
People from Loja, Ecuador
Harvard Kennedy School alumni
Christian Democratic Union (Ecuador) politicians
Leaders ousted by a coup
Ecuadorian politicians convicted of crimes
Fulbright alumni